Melissa, in French Mélissa, is a given name for a female, meaning "honey bee" in the Greek language.

Melissa may also refer to:

People
Melissa (philosopher), Pythagorean philosopher
Melissa (singer), Lebanese singer
Cheerleader Melissa (born 1982), American professional wrestler
Melissa Aronson (born 1963), professionally known as "Emme", supermodel/activist
Melissa Barrera (born 1990), Mexican actress and singer
Melissa Benoist (born 1988), American actress
Melissa Brannen (born 1984), a kidnapping victim
Melissa Coates (born 1969), Canadian professional wrestler
Melissa Errico (born 1970), American singer
Melissa Etheridge (born 1961), American singer
Melissa George (born 1976), Australian actress
Melissa Gilbert (born 1964), American actress
Melissa Gregory (born 1981), American figure skater
Melissa Grelo (born 1977), Canadian television personality
Melissa Haney (born 1981), Inuk air pilot from Quebec, Canada
Melissa Joan Hart (born 1976), American actress
Melissa Hiatt (born 1963), American professional wrestling manager
Melissa Horn (born 1987), Swedish singer
Melissa Kuys (born 1987), Australian rules footballer
Melissa Lawson (born 1976), American singer
Melissa M (born 1985), French singer
Melissa Manchester (born 1951), American singer
Melissa Moore, multiple people
Melissa Nobles, American political scientist and academic administrator 
Melissa O'Neil, Canadian singer
Lady Melissa Percy (born 1987), English fashion designer
Melissa Ricks (born 1990), Filipina actress
Melissa Rivers (born 1968) American actress/producer
Melissa Straker (born 1976), Barbadian athlete
Melissa Sagemiller (born 1974), American actress
Melissa Tkautz (born 1974), Australian actress
Melissa VanFleet (born 1986), American singer-songwriter

Places

Canada 
Melissa, Ontario, a community in Muskoka Region

Greece 
Cape Melissa, a cape on the island of Ithaca, Ionian Islands
Melissa, Elis, a municipal district in Elis, West Greece
Melissa, Karditsa, a village in Karditsa regional unit, Thessaly
Melissa, Kavala, a village in Kavala regional unit, East Macedonia and Thrace
Melissa, a village in the municipal unit Kileler, Larissa regional unit, Thessaly
Melissa, Xanthi, a village in Xanthi regional unit, East Macedonia and Thrace

Italy 
Melissa, Calabria, a comune in the Province of Crotone

United States 
Melissa, Texas, a city in Collin County
Melissa, West Virginia

Entertainment
Melissa (novel), by Alex Gino, originally published as George in 2015
Melissa (1964 TV series), a British television series
Melissa (1997 TV series), a British television series
Melissa, a character in British soap opera Hollyoaks
Melissa, a character in the Gilbert and Sullivan comic opera Princess Ida
Melissa, a character in Seinfeld episode The Apology
Melissa, a character in the movie The Hangover
Melissa, the house band for The Late Late Show with James Corden
Melissa Fitzgerald, a character in the 2013 American crime comedy movie We're the Millers

Albums
Melissa (Melissa Manchester album), 1975
Melissa (Mercyful Fate album), 1983
Songs
"Melissa" (song), by the Allman Brothers Band
"Mélissa", a song by French singer Enrico Macias
"Mélissa", a song by French singer Julien Clerc
"Melissa", a 1983 song by Mercyful Fate
"Melissa", a 2003 single by Porno Graffitti

Other uses
MELiSSA, a project to develop a plant based ecosystem
Melissa (chimpanzee), a Tanzanian chimpanzee
Melissa (computer virus), a computer virus
Melissa (crater), a crater on the far side of the Moon
Melissa (plant), a genus of flowering plants in the family Lamiaceae
Melissa (sorceress), a fictional sorceress in the legendary history Matter of France
Melissa (wine), an Italian wine from the province of Crotone
Melissa River, a river of Paraná state in southern Brazil

See also
 
 Melisa (disambiguation)